Paul Shu-Pei Tien, Ph.D. is an American educator who was born in Tianjin, China and grew up in Taiwan. He emigrated to the United States to pursue graduate education in electrical engineering, and later became a professor of electrical engineering in Ohio. In January 1978, Dr. Tien established the American University of the Caribbean School of Medicine (AUC) on the Caribbean island of Montserrat. AUC is now located on the island of Sint Maarten.

Paul Tien is the chancellor of AUC;   while his son, Yife Tien, is the chancellor of Rocky Vista University College of Osteopathic Medicine.

References

American educators
21st-century American engineers
American people of Chinese descent
American people of Taiwanese descent
University and college founders
Living people
Year of birth missing (living people)